Herbert Cosgrove (died 1953) was a well known Australian baritone and composer of light ephemera. Cosgrove was married.

Career

Cosgrove used his position as a well-known entertainer to work as a vocal accompanist for Aeolian gramophone, and Marcus and Clark music store and later at Nicholson's Music Publisher in Sydney.

At the height of his career, he toured the world and his magnum opus "Mothers Hands" was featured at the London Palladium by Singer Essie Ackland

Background

Herbert grew up in Botany Bay area. In his youth he narrowly escaped being killed by his own horse.

He was a Catholic and performed ecclesiastic works at St Mary's Basilica in Sydney. He also played organ Later in life he lived in Rose Bay and collected art.

Works

 Nobody Knows But Mother – Mother's Day Song dedicated to Dusolina Giannini
 When I am grown
 Mother's hands – featured at the London Palladium with Essie Ackland
 Night thoughts
 Here in this solemn hour
 Summertime in Devon

References

Australian male composers
Australian composers
Composers for piano
Australian musical theatre composers
Australian singer-songwriters
Lists of Roman Catholics
Lists of performers of Christian music
1953 deaths
20th-century Australian musicians
Musicians from Sydney
20th-century Australian male musicians
Australian male singer-songwriters